Carlos D. Almaraz (October 5, 1941 – December 11, 1989) was a Mexican-American artist and a pioneer of the Chicano art movement.

Early life and education
Almaraz was born on October 5, 1941, in Mexico City, Mexico to parents Roe and Rudolph Almaraz. His family moved when he was a young child, settling in Chicago, Illinois, where his father owned a restaurant for five years and worked in Gary steel mills for another four.  The neighborhood Almaraz and his brothers Rudolph Jr. and Ricky were raised in was multicultural, which led him to appreciate the melting pot of American culture. During his youth in Chicago, the family traveled to Mexico City frequently, where Almaraz reports having his "first impression of art" that "was both horrifying and absolutely magical", in other words "Sublime".

When Almaraz was age nine, his family moved to Los Angeles on a doctor's recommendation that his father seek a warm climate to assuage his rheumatism, and also as a result of family problems, first settling in Wilmington, later moving to the then-rural Chatsworth, where they lived in communal housing with other Mexicans. The family then relocated to Beverly Hills, and later to the barrio of East Los Angeles. Almaraz's interest in the arts, nascent in Chicago, blossomed after his family moved to California, and the sense of mobility developed after so many moves later allowed him to connect with migrant farmworkers and their children.

He graduated from Garfield High School in 1959 and attended Los Angeles City College, studying under David Ramirez, and took summer classes at Loyola Marymount University. Loyola offered him a full scholarship, but he declined it in protest of the university's support of the Vietnam War and stopped professing the Catholic faith altogether. He attended California State University, Los Angeles (CalState LA), where he befriended Frank Romero.

He became discouraged by the structure of the art department at CalState LA. Almaraz began attending night courses at the Otis College of Art and Design (then known as Otis Art Institute), studying under Joe Mugnaini. In 1974, he earned an MFA degree from the Otis College of Art and Design.

Almaraz studied arts at University of California, Los Angeles (UCLA).

Career

In 1965, Almaraz moved to New York City, with Dan Guerrero, the son of Lalo Guerrero.  He left after six months to take advantage of a scholarship offered him by Otis Art Institute. He returned to New York and lived there from 1966 to 1969, where he struggled as a painter in the middle of the New Wave movements of the era.

While in New York, he also wrote poetry and philosophy. Almaraz's poems and philosophical views have been published in fifty books.

After returning to California, Almaraz almost died in 1971, and was given the last rites. It has been said that he had an experience with God during his convalescence. By 1972, he was already involved with Cesar Chavez and the United Farm Workers (UFW).

In 1973, he was one of four artists who formed the influential artist collective known as Los Four. In 1974, Judithe Hernández, who was a friend and classmate from graduate school at Otis Art Institute became the fifth member and the only woman in Los Four. With the addition of Hernández, the collective exhibited and created public art together for the next decade and have been credited with bringing Chicano art to the attention of mainstream American art institutions. He also painted for Luis Valdez's Teatro Campesino. Some of his murals are heavily influenced by the actos from Teatro Campesino.

His "Echo Park" series of paintings, named after a Los Angeles park of the same name, became known worldwide and have been displayed in many museums internationally. On November 12, 1978, Almaraz wrote "Because love is not found in Echo Park, I'll go where it is found". While Almaraz may not have found love at Echo Park, he certainly found inspiration to produce paintings there: he lived close to the park, having a clear view of the park from his apartment's window.

Another of Almaraz's works, named "Boycott Gallo", became a cultural landmark in the community of East Los Angeles. During the late 1980s, however, "Boycott Gallo" was brought down.

Six Almaraz works are exhibited in the Smithsonian American Art Museum, and one is exhibited at the Whitney Museum of American Art.

Personal life 
Almaraz was public about being queer, and it was documented in his journals (which were later made public).

In 1981, Almaraz married Elsa Flores, a Chicana artist. Together, the pair produced "California Dreamscape". They had one daughter.

Death and legacy 
Carlos Almaraz died on December 11, 1989,  of AIDS-related causes at the Sherman Oaks Community Hospital, in Sherman Oaks neighborhood of Los Angeles.

He is remembered as an artist who used his talent to bring critical attention to the early Chicano Art Movement, as well as a supporter of Cesar Chávez and the UFW.  His work continues to enjoy popularity. In 1992 the Los Angeles County Museum of Art honored him with a tribute featuring 28 of his drawings and prints donated by his widow. Flores continues to represent his estate.

An exhibition of his paintings, pastels, and drawings from the 70s and 80s opened in September 2011, in conjunction with the Getty Research Institute's "Pacific Standard Time: Art in LA 1945-1980". Almaraz will also be featured in corresponding "Pacific Standard Time" exhibitions, including "MEX/LA: Mexican Modernism(s) in Los Angeles 1930-1985" at the Museum of Latin American Art, "Mapping Another L.A.: The Chicano Art Movement" at the Fowler Museum.

Almaraz was the subject of am 85 minute documentary, Carlos Almaraz: Playing With Fire (2020), which was directed by his widow Elsa Flores Almaraz, and actor and filmmaker Richard Montoya.

Almaraz and Flores's papers are preserved at the Smithsonian.

Notable work 

Examples of Almaraz's work can be found in Cheech Marin's collection of Chicano art housed at The Cheech Marin Center for Chicano Art, Culture & Industry.

See also

List of notable Chicanos

References

External links

 Almaraz in the permanent collection at LACMA
Art of Aztlan Gallery
Print Retrospective Exhibition

1941 births
1989 deaths
20th-century American painters
American male painters
Painters from California
American artists of Mexican descent
Mexican emigrants to the United States
Los Angeles City College alumni
California State University, Los Angeles alumni
UCLA School of the Arts and Architecture alumni
Loyola Marymount University alumni
Artists from Mexico City
Artists from Chicago
Former Roman Catholics
People from Echo Park, Los Angeles
Otis College of Art and Design alumni
Chicano
LGBT painters
AIDS-related deaths in California
Queer artists
Hispanic and Latino American artists
20th-century American LGBT people
20th-century Mexican LGBT people
20th-century American male artists